Mitogen-activated protein kinase kinase kinase 10 is an enzyme that in humans is encoded by the MAP3K10 gene.

Function 

The protein encoded by this gene is a member of the serine/threonine kinase family. This kinase has been shown to activate MAPK8/JNK and MKK4/SEK1, and this kinase itself can be phosphorylated, and thus activated by JNK kinases. This kinase functions preferentially on the JNK signaling pathway, and is reported to be involved in nerve growth factor (NGF) induced neuronal apoptosis.

Interactions 

MAP3K10 has been shown to interact with:
 CDC42, 
 Huntingtin, 
 KIF3A, 
 MAPK8IP1, 
 MAPK8IP2, and
 NEUROD1.

References

Further reading 

 
 
 
 
 
 
 
 
 
 
 
 
 
 
 
 

EC 2.7.11